M. edulis may refer to:
 Maerua edulis (Gilg. & Ben.) De Wolf, a plant species in the genus Maerua
 Metteniusa edulis, a plant species endemic to Colombia
 Mytilus edulis, the blue mussel, a medium-sized edible marine bivalve mollusc species

See also
 Edulis (disambiguation)